The Allard Prize for International Integrity is one of the world's largest prizes dedicated to the fight against corruption and the protection of human rights. The prize is awarded biennially to an individual, movement or organization that has "demonstrated exceptional courage and leadership in combating corruption, especially through promoting transparency, accountability and the Rule of Law." The winner receives the Allard Prize Award, a uniquely crafted brass artwork, and CAD$100,000. Honourable mention recipients are awarded a unique nickel-plated artwork, and may also receive a cash award.

At the 2017 Award Ceremony, Pulitzer Prize-winning journalist Glenn Greenwald stated that the Allard Prize “is important … and isn't devoted just to honouring anti-corruption crusaders, but to constructing and fortifying a framework that really does protect them and enables the work to proceed much more safely," and "this kind of courage can be very contagious." Past Allard Prize winners and others have said that the Allard Prize assists, supports and protects those working in anti-corruption and their work. Canada's National Observer calls The Allard Prize 'The Oscars of anti-corruption'.

The Allard Prize and Allard Prize Foundation, the charitable organization that supports the Allard Prize, were founded in 2011 and are funded by lawyer and businessman Peter A. Allard, Q.C. The Allard Prize Committee is responsible for the oversight, organization and selection of the Prize winner and honourable mention recipients. From 2013 until June 21, 2019 the Prize was administered at the Peter A. Allard School of Law at the University of British Columbia, Vancouver, Canada. The Allard Prize is now independent of UBC.

Some Allard Prize nominees and winners have previously been subjected to threats, violence, torture, imprisonment and other attacks associated with their anti-corruption and human rights activities. 2020 Allard Prize co-recipient Daphne Caruana Galizia and 2015 honourable mention recipient Sergei Magnitsky both received the Allard Prize posthumously. Maltese journalist Caruna-Galizia was assassinated by car bomb in 2017. Russian auditor Magnitsky died after being tortured in prison.

Nomination and selection

The Allard Prize winner and any honourable mention recipients are chosen through a comprehensive nomination and selection process involving the Allard Prize Committee, sub-committees and an Advisory Board. For the 2015 Allard Prize, over 140 people were nominated from 50 countries. In 2017, the number of nominations grew to 244 from 70 countries, with 42 nominations (17 percent) from North America. In 2020 there were 525 nominations received from 80 countries.

Nomination
There are no restrictions as to who may submit a nominee for consideration. Nominations may come from anywhere including from members of the Allard Prize Committee. Self-nominations are allowed for both individuals and organizations. Nominees range from neighbourhood activists to prominent world leaders, academics, social movements, political organizations and charitable groups.

Nominations are accepted on a rolling basis, with a new nomination cycle beginning with the announcement of finalists in the Prize year. Previously nominated candidates can be re-nominated, but new nomination forms must be submitted. There are no minimum or maximum age limits or any other limiting characteristics as to eligibility, with the exception that members of the Allard Prize Committee, Advisory Board and members of their immediate families may not be awarded the Allard Prize during their respective terms and for one year following the end of their terms.

Selection
The Allard Prize Committee reviews all nominations and is responsible for selecting the Prize winner and any honourable mention recipients. The selection process involves research, subcommittees and due diligence, two levels of short-listing, and a requirement to submit short-listed of nominees to the Allard Prize Advisory Board for review and comment prior to the selection of the winner and honourable mention recipients.

Awarding the Prize
The 2015 and 2017 Allard Prize public awards ceremonies were held at the University of British Columbia's Old Auditorium and were live-streamed over the Internet. The 2020 Allard Prize Ceremony was conducted online only via live streaming from Vancouver, Canada due to the COVID-19 pandemic.

The list of Allard Prize 'finalists' is released approximately one month prior to the Prize Ceremony. The public announcement identifying the Allard Prize winner is made at the Prize Ceremony, typically held in September or October of the award year. Finalists attend the ceremony in Vancouver, British Columbia, Canada, and become part of the growing Allard Prize anti-corruption network. Travel expenses are paid by the Allard Prize. Past award ceremony keynote speakers include Canadian diplomat Stephen Lewis (2013), Lieutenant-General Roméo Dallaire (2015), Pulitzer Prize winning journalist Glenn Greenwald (2017)., and for the 2020 ceremony - Pulitzer Prize winning journalist Chris Hedges.

List of Allard Prize Recipients and Honourable Mentions
As of 2020, the Allard Prize has been awarded to six individuals (one posthumously). Three organizations, one government office and three individuals (one posthumously) have received Honourable Mention.

Controversies

Protest against selection of finalist Operação Lava Jato (Brazil - Car Wash Task Force) - 2017 
The selection of Brazil's Car Wash Task Force (Operação Lava Jato) as a 2017 Allard Prize finalist triggered objections in Brazil and Canada. A group of Brazilian lawyers wrote to the Allard Prize Committee demanding the Committee rescind their finalist status and alleging "numerous abuses, arbitrariness and legal violations" by the Task Force. A group of University of British Columbia faculty and students supported the Brazilian lawyer group. During the September 28, 2017 Prize Ceremony, several audience members made vocal outbursts against the Car Wash Task Force.

In response, 2017 Allard Prize keynote speaker Glenn Greenwald said in his keynote address that while the Operation Car Wash Task Force had made some mistakes, powerful investigative work often creates controversy and enemies. In a post-award open discussion at the Allard School of Law, opponents confronted the Task Force's lead prosecutor Deltan Dallagnol with their criticisms, who responded during a recorded video session.

Allegation of Third World Bias 
Shortly after the 2017 Allard Prize finalists were announced, journalist Russell Mokhiber noted in an article published in Corporate Crime Reporter that the Allard Prize has "a bias in favour of anti-corruption fighters in the Third World" rather than selecting nominees from Western developed countries. Mokhiber speculated that the bias might be due to a heavy representation of corporate lawyers, World Bank and Asian Development Bank personnel on the selection and advisory committees. In an interview with Mokhiber, Allard Prize Executive Director Nicole Barrett acknowledged that none of the previous finalists have been from North America. Noting that the majority of nominees are from the developing world, she said that the Allard Prize may consider developing a formal requirement of geographical balance to address this concern.

Photography and video competitions 
The Allard Prize Committee also adjudicates the bi-annual Allard Photography Competition and the Allard Video Competition. Both competitions align with the ideals of the Allard Prize of combating corruption and protecting human rights.

In November 2018, one of the winners of the Photography Competition was Darrin Zammit Lupi whose winning photograph titled Justice for Daphne showed a vigil and protest calling for justice in the case of Maltese journalist Daphne Caruana Galizia who was murdered in 2017. Caruana Galizia was awarded the Allard Prize posthumously in 2020.

References

External links
 Allard Prize for International Integrity - Allard Prize Official website
 Allard Prize online nominations

Human rights awards